The South Africa men's national under-21 field hockey team represents South Africa at international field hockey matches and tournaments.

Tournament record

Junior World Cup

Junior Africa Hockey Cup
 1997 – 
 2001 – 
 2004 – 
 2008 – 
 2012 – 
 2016 – 
 2021 - Cancelled
 2023 –

Sultan of Johor Cup
 2022 – 5th

Current squad

FIH Hockey Junior World Cup Current squad
The following 18 players were named on 18 October 2021 for the 2021 Men's FIH Hockey Junior World Cup in Bhubaneswar, India.

Caps updated as of 4 December 2021, after the match against South Korea.

Junior Africa Hockey Cup Current squad
The squad was announced on 28 February 2023.

Head coach: Guy Elliott

See also
South Africa men's national field hockey team
South Africa women's national under-21 field hockey team

Notes

References

Men's national under-21 field hockey teams
Field hockey
Field hockey in South Africa